Al-Ukhaydir could refer to the following places:

Al-Ukhaidir Fortress, a fortress in the Karbala Governorate, Iraq
Al-Ukhaydir, Makkah Province, a village in Makkah Province, Saudi Arabia
Al-Ukhaydir, Tabuk Province, a fort in Tabuk Province, Saudi Arabia